Julie on Sesame Street was a variety special broadcast in the United States on ABC on November 23, 1973 at 9 PM ET / PT. Sponsored on ABC by technology/telecommunications conglomerate GTE, the special starred Julie Andrews and Perry Como, and they were joined by several of Jim Henson's Muppets from the PBS children's series, Sesame Street. No human members of the Sesame Street cast appeared in this special. Andrews and "special guest star" Como interacted with the Muppet characters (including Kermit the Frog, Big Bird, Cookie Monster, Oscar the Grouch, Grover, and Bert and Ernie), sharing comedic banter and singing songs such as "It's Not Easy Being Green" and "Picture a World" on the Sesame Street "neighborhood" set.

The special was produced by ATV and ITC at ATV Elstree in the United Kingdom (and not at Sesame Streets then-usual New York City studios), It was televised in that country on ITV on July 10, 1974 at 8pm in most regions. The special was the first Muppets-related program to be produced with ATV and ITC, who would both co-produce the highly successful The Muppet Show three years later.

Muppet cast

 Jim Henson as Ernie, Kermit the Frog
 Frank Oz as Bert, Cookie Monster, Grover
 Jerry Nelson as Biff, Frazzle, Mr. Snuffleupagus
 Caroll Spinney as Big Bird, Oscar the Grouch
 Richard Hunt
 Kermit Love
 Jane Henson

External links

Sesame Street features
British television specials
Television series by ITC Entertainment
Television series by ITV Studios
American Broadcasting Company original programming
1973 television specials
Television shows produced by Associated Television (ATV)
English-language television shows
Television shows shot at ATV Elstree Studios